John Ogilvie may refer to:

John Ogilvie (Canada), Ontario political candidate
John Ogilvie (South African cricketer) (born 1958), South African cricketer
John Ogilvie (Wellington cricketer) (born 1931), New Zealand cricketer
John Ogilvie (Central Districts cricketer) (born 1969), New Zealand cricketer
John Ogilvie (footballer) (1928-2020), Scottish footballer
John Ogilvie (lexicographer) (1797–1867), Scottish lexicographer
John Ogilvie (miller) (1833–1888), Canadian businessman and miller
John Ogilvie (poet) (1733–1813), clergyman and poet
John Ogilvie (saint) (1579–1615), Scottish Roman Catholic Jesuit martyr

See also
John Ogilvie High School, Hamilton, Scotland
John Ogilvy (disambiguation)